Prostanthera cineolifera, commonly known as the Singleton mint bush, is a species of flowering plant in the family Lamiaceae and is endemic to eastern New South Wales.  It is an erect shrub with hairy branches, narrow egg-shaped leaves and clusters of pale mauve to dark purple-mauve flowers arranged on the ends of branchlets.

Description
Flowering occurs from September to October.

Taxonomy
Prostanthera cineolifera was first formally described in 1912 by Richard Thomas Baker and Henry George Smith in Journal and Proceedings of the Royal Society of New South Wales.

Distribution and habitat
Singleton mint bush has been observed in scattered localities in New South Wales including at Apsley Falls near Walcha, and at scattered places in the Hunter Valley. It grows in forest and woodland on exposed ridges.

Conservation status
This mintbush is classified as "vulnerable" under the Australian Government Environment Protection and Biodiversity Conservation Act and the New South Wales Government Biodiversity Conservation Act 2016. The main threats to the species include inappropriate fire regimes and its apparently small population size.

References

cineolifera
Flora of New South Wales
Lamiales of Australia
Taxa named by Richard Thomas Baker
Taxa named by Henry George Smith
Plants described in 1912
Endemic flora of Australia